Charles Louis Lelong (18 March 1891 – 27 June 1970) was a French sprinter who competed at the 1912 Summer Olympics. He won a silver medal in the 4×400 metre relay and failed to reach the finals of 100 m, 200 m, 400 m and 4×100 metre relay events.

References

1891 births
1970 deaths
French male sprinters
Olympic silver medalists for France
Athletes (track and field) at the 1912 Summer Olympics
Olympic athletes of France
Sportspeople from Calvados (department)
Medalists at the 1912 Summer Olympics
Olympic silver medalists in athletics (track and field)